Hodgen is an unincorporated community in Le Flore County, Oklahoma, United States. The post office was established on April 25, 1910.

Hodgen (formerly Hodgens) was named for James M. Hodgens, a railroad official.

Geography

Climate

Demographics

References

Unincorporated communities in Le Flore County, Oklahoma
Unincorporated communities in Oklahoma
Fort Smith metropolitan area